World Software Corporation is a privately held corporation and the creator and distributor of Worldox, a Document Management System. World Software Corporation has 6,000 customers in 52 countries and 200 resellers; 5,200 customer installations with 4,800 being law firms, legal departments and legal organizations, 300 financial services firms and 100 in other industries.

History 
World Software Corporation was founded in New Jersey in 1988 by Tom Burke and Kristina Burke.

World Software Corporation has produced 30 product versions.

World Software and Worldox technology have established and maintained a single, dedicated product and corporate focus of a Legal Document Management System over these 30 years.

Worldox technology synchronizes the Cloud, Mobile, internet (browser) and (MS:) Windows environments by providing the core requirement of a seamless, cross-platform digital filing system for documents, emails, and objects (aka unstructured data).

Products

Customers
Notable organizations using Worldox include:

Law Firms
Jones Walker LLP
Eckert Seamans
Maynard, Cooper & Gale, P.C.
Sullivan & Worcester LLP
Corporations:
Alcoa
Boise Cascade
Daimler Chrysler
Deutsche Bank		
Hilton Hotels & Resorts
Pacific Gas and Electric Company
Pitney Bowes
Purolator Inc.
Non-Profits and Non-Governmental Organizations:
The World Bank
Columbia University 
New York University
Ohio State University
Princeton University
The Legal Aid Society of San Francisco
Financial/Accounting Firms:
Citigroup 
Crowe Horwath

See also 
 Cloud Computing
 Document Management System
 Software as a Service

References 

Software companies based in New Jersey
Companies established in 1988
Software companies of the United States